Alexus G. "Grynch" Grynkewich is a United States Air Force lieutenant general who serves as the commander of the Ninth Air Force. He previously served as the director of operations of the United States Central Command.

References

Living people
Place of birth missing (living people)
Recipients of the Defense Superior Service Medal
Recipients of the Legion of Merit
United States Air Force generals
Year of birth missing (living people)